Lesane may refer to:

Lesane, Apace, in Slovenia
Lesane, Suva Reka, in Kosovo